William Kenefick (born William Sebastian Kenefick II; August 12, 1971) is an American entrepreneur, businessman, investor, and  former television personality. . . William was featured on Throttle Junkies TV in several movies, and is a motorcycle designer with dozens of Motorcycle Magazine features and covers world wide.

Career

Custom Motorcycles
William nicknames his project bikes and cars, starting with Natasha - a 1995 Ducati 900SS which was completed in 1997. 
Natasha, Ducati 900SS
Isabella, Ducati Monster
Freddie Spencer Tribute, Honda CBR1000RR
Wayne Rainey Tribute
Full Tilt Boogie, featured in Robb Report Motorcycling and owned by Tim Allen
Hideo “Pops” Yoshimura Tribute, Motorcyclist Magazine November 2008
Transformers: Revenge of the Fallen motorcycles
Afari Seri, The first custom Ducati Streetfighter

Fata a Mano, Hand built Ducati Cafe Racer

Work

Personal life
William lives in Austin, Texas with his three children and wife, Summers McKay.

References

General references
Fill Tilt Boogie Ducati Monster
Wayne Rainey Tribute article
Cycle World article on Wayne Rainey Tribute
Ventura County Star article
Freddie Spencer Tribute
Transformers 2 interview

External links
 Prophecy Cycles
 Transformers: Revenge Of The Fallen
 Cycle World "Special Feature: RetroSBK Custom 2010 Ducati Streetfighter"
 ARCEE Motorcycles
 VC Star
 Cycle World Rainey Tribute

1971 births
Motorcycle builders
Living people